Neill is an Irish surname, and may refer to

 A. S. Neill (1883-1973), British educator and author
 Alec Neill (b.1950), New Zealand politician
 Ben Neill (b.1957), American composer
 Bob Neill (b.1952), British politician
 Bud Neill (1911-1970), Scottish cartoonist 
 Casey Neill, American musician
 Edward Duffield Neill, American minister, author, and educator, secretary to Abraham Lincoln
 Fiona Neill, British author and columnist
 James C. Neill (c.1788–1848), American soldier and politician
 James George Smith Neill (1810-1857), British army general
 Jay Wesley Neill (1965-2002), American murderer
 John R. Neill (1877-1943), American book illustrator
 John W. Neill (b.1934), British hockey player
 Lucas Neill (b.1978), Australian soccer player
 Noel Neill (1920-2016), American film and television actress
 Patrick Neill (disambiguation), multiple people
 Paul Neill (1882-1968), American electrical engineer
 Roy William Neill (1887-1946), Irish-American film director
 Sam Neill (b.1947), New Zealand actor
 Stephen Neill (1900–1984), British Anglican bishop, missionary and scholar 
 Terry Neill (disambiguation), multiple people
 Wilfred T. Neill (1922-2001), American herpetologist
 William Neill (disambiguation), multiple people

See also
 O'Neill (disambiguation)
 Neil, a given name of which Neill is a variant

ja:ニール